Pleiocarpa is a genus of plant in the family Apocynaceae first described as a genus in 1876. It is native to tropical Africa from Senegal to Tanzania and south to Zimbabwe.  the World Checklist of Selected Plant Families recognises 6 species:

Species
 Pleiocarpa bicarpellata Stapf - Cabinda, Cameroon, Republic of Congo, Gabon, Zaire, Kenya 
 Pleiocarpa brevistyla Omino - Gabon
 Pleiocarpa mutica Benth. - Ghana, Ivory Coast, Liberia, Sierra Leone, Nigeria, Cameroon, Gabon, Central African Republic, Republic of Congo 
 Pleiocarpa picralimoides (Pichon) Omino - Cabinda, Republic of Congo, Gabon
 Pleiocarpa pycnantha (K.Schum) Stapf - widespread across most of tropical Africa
 Pleiocarpa rostrata Benth. - Nigeria, Cameroon, Gabon

formerly included in genus
 Pleiocarpa camerunensis (K.Schum. ex Hallier f.) Stapf = Hunteria camerunensis K.Schum. ex Hallier f.
 Pleiocarpa hockii De Wild. - Acokanthera oppositifolia (Lam.) Codd
 Pleiocarpa simii (Stapf) Stapf ex Hutch. & Dalziel = Hunteria simii (Stapf) H.Huber

References

 
Apocynaceae genera
Flora of Africa